Buffalo is an unincorporated community in Sullivan County, Tennessee, United States.

Notes

Unincorporated communities in Sullivan County, Tennessee
Unincorporated communities in Tennessee